Petroleum Training Institute (P.T.I.) in Effurun, Delta State was established in 1973 by the federal government of Nigeria as a prerequisite for the membership in the Organization of Petroleum Exporting Countries (OPEC) to train indigenous middle-level manpower to meet the labour force demands of the oil and gas industry in Nigeria and the West African subregion. It awards General Welding Certificates, ND (National Diploma) and HND (Higher National Diploma) certificates.

Overview 

The institute is headed by the Principal and CEO Henry Adimula, who was appointed this position on 17 June 2021. Before becoming Principal of the institute he was Vice Principal and after that he became acting Principle, which happened following the expiration of the first four-year term of the former principal of the institution, Prof. Sunny E. Iyuke on 3 July 2020.

Departments In Petroleum Training Institute 
The following are the departments in the institution;
 Petroleum & Natural Gas Processing (PNGPD)
 Industrial Safety and Environmental Technology (ISET)
 Petroleum Marketing and Business Studies (PMBS)
 Petroleum Engineering and Geosciences (PEG)
 Electrical/Electronics Engineering (EEED)
 Welding Engineering and Offshore Technology (DWEOT)
 Mechanical Engineering (MED)
 Science Laboratory Technology (SLT)
 Computer Science and Information Technology (CSIT)
 Computer Engineering (COMPT)
 Environmental Science and Management Technology (ESMT)

See also
List of polytechnics in Nigeria

References

External links
Petroleum Training Institute, Effurun 
National Universities Commission of Nigeria

Federal universities of Nigeria
Educational institutions established in 1973
1973 establishments in Nigeria
Energy education
Petroleum in Nigeria
Technological universities in Nigeria